William John Farmer  (born 10 June 1947) is a retired senior Australian public servant and policymaker, best known for his time as Secretary of the Department of Immigration and Multicultural Affairs and for his career in the Australian diplomatic service.

Background and early life
Bill Farmer graduated from the University of Sydney with a Bachelor of Arts with Honours and from the London School of Economics with a Master of Science in Economics.

Career
Farmer started his public service career in the Department of External Affairs in 1969. His early Australian Public Service roles saw him serving in Cairo, London and Suva. He was Deputy Permanent Representative of Australia to the United Nations in New York 1984–1987; Australian Ambassador to Mexico, the Central American Republics and Cuba 1987–1989; Australian High Commissioner  in Papua New Guinea 1993–1995 and in Malaysia 1996–1997; and Deputy Secretary of the Department of Foreign Affairs and Trade 1997–1998.

Between 1998 and 2005, Farmer was secretary of the Australian immigration department. The department was first known as the Department of Immigration and Multicultural Affairs when he was appointed, and later called the Department of Immigration and Multicultural and Indigenous Affairs. In 2001, he also held the concurrent appointment of secretary of the short-lived Department of Reconciliation and Aboriginal and Torres Strait Islander Affairs.

In 2005 Farmer was appointed Australia's ambassador to Indonesia, replacing David Ritchie. Media saw Farmer's appointment as "something of a reward... after service to the Howard government through many immigration controversies". However, in the post his initial appointment was extended under the Labor government by two years. While in Jakarta, Farmer assisted in negotiations to return a group of 78 Sri Lankan asylum seekers to Indonesia after they were apprehended by the Australian Customs vessel Oceanic Viking. He also helped to send Australian-funded relief aid to victims of the 2009 Sumatra earthquakes.

Farmer retired in 2010. In retirement, he headed an independent review of Australia's live animal export trade, tasked in June 2011 to examine the facilities, treatment and handling of livestock in Indonesia. Farmer made 14 recommendations, including that live animal exporters should be required to ensure their "supply chains" comply with international animal welfare standards. He also served on the High-Level Review of the Australian Aid program 2010–2011, and chaired an Independent Review of the Australian Centre for International Agricultural Research. He was Senior Advisor for the Australia/PNG Kokoda Initiative 2014–2016.

Awards
Farmer was awarded the Centenary Medal in 2003 and, in June 2005, was appointed an Officer of the Order of Australia for service to the community through contributions to Australia's international relations and to major public policy development including domestic security, border systems, immigration, multicultural affairs and Indigenous service delivery. He is a Fellow of the Australian Institute of International Affairs.

References

Ambassadors of Australia to Indonesia
Ambassadors of Australia to Mexico
High Commissioners of Australia to Malaysia
High Commissioners of Australia to Papua New Guinea
Officers of the Order of Australia
Living people
University of Sydney alumni
Alumni of the London School of Economics
Secretaries of the Australian Government Immigration Department
Recipients of the Centenary Medal
1947 births